= Power cell =

Power cell may refer to:

- Battery (electricity), an array of galvanic cells for storing electricity.
- Electrochemical cell, a device that generates electricity from chemical reactions.
- Fuel cell, an electrochemical energy conversion chamber using reactants.
- Solar cell, a photovoltaic panel that converts light energy into electricity.
